Hilda M. Tadria is a Ugandan women's rights activist, a gender and social development specialist, and the executive director of the Mentoring and Empowerment Programme for Young Women in Uganda (MEMPROW). She has advised NGOs worldwide on gender, institutional management and social development, and has been an associate professor at Makerere University.

Early life
Tadria has a bachelor's degree in sociology from Makerere University, a master's degree in social anthropology from Newnham College, Cambridge, England, and a PhD in social anthropology from the University of Minnesota, US.

Career
Tadria has worked as a consultant on gender, institutional management and social development for the World Bank, UNDP, UNIFEM, the Ugandan government, the Canadian International Development Agency (CIDA) and NOVIB.

Tadria was an associate professor in the Department of Sociology at Makerere University, and while there founded the non-governmental organisation (NGO), Action for Development (ACFODE).

In September 2017, she led a workshop for a group of "leading African feminists" at the South African organisation Masimanyane Women's Rights International, together with Dorcas Coker-Appiah, the executive director of Ghana's Gender Studies and Human Rights Documentation Centre, and provided a "powerful workshop unpacking the patriarchy system".

References

Living people
Ugandan feminists
Alumni of Newnham College, Cambridge
Makerere University alumni
University of Minnesota College of Liberal Arts alumni
Academic staff of Makerere University
Year of birth missing (living people)